Jaime Batres (28 June 1964 – August 2019) was a Guatemalan footballer. He competed in the men's tournament at the 1988 Summer Olympics.

References

External links
 

1964 births
2019 deaths
Guatemalan footballers
Guatemala international footballers
Olympic footballers of Guatemala
Footballers at the 1988 Summer Olympics
Place of birth missing
Association football midfielders